"Wait for Me" is a song by American rock band Kings of Leon. The song was released in the United Kingdom on August 6, 2013 as the second single from their sixth studio album Mechanical Bull (2013). On Sunday August 11, it debuted at number 31 in the UK Singles Chart, and as of 2021, remains their most recent UK Top 40 hit.

Track listings
 Digital download
 "Wait for Me" – 3:29

 7" vinyl
 "Wait for Me" – 3:29
 "Don't Matter" (Live) – 3:00

Charts

Weekly charts

Year-end charts

Certifications

Release history

References

Kings of Leon songs
2013 singles
2013 songs
RCA Records singles
Songs written by Caleb Followill
Songs written by Jared Followill
Songs written by Matthew Followill
Songs written by Nathan Followill
Rock ballads